The Tovero (also known as Tobero) coloration is a mix of tobiano and overo colorations in Pinto horses and American Paint Horses.  The genetics of pinto coloration are not always fully understood, and some horses have a combination of patterns that does not fit cleanly in either category.

Some characteristics of a Tovero colored horse include:
Dark pigmentation around the ears, sometimes called a "Medicine Hat" or a "War bonnet"
Dark pigmentation around the ears, expanding to cover the forehead and/or eyes. 
Isolated "shield" dark markings completely surrounded by white, particularly on the face or chest.
One or both eyes blue. 
Dark pigmentation around the mouth, which may extend up the sides of the face and form spots. 
Chest spot(s) in varying sizes. These may also extend up the neck. 
Flank spot(s) ranging in size. These are often accompanied by smaller spots that extend forward across the barrel, and up over the loin. 
Spots, varying in size, at the base of the tail.

See also
Pinto horse
American Paint Horse
Equine coat color

References

Paul D. Vrotsos RVT and Elizabeth M. Santschi DVM. University of Minnesota Genetics Group. "Stalking the Lethal White Syndrome". Paint Horse Journal. July 1998.
 "Horse coat color tests" from the UC Davis Veterinary Genetics Lab
"Introduction to Coat Color Genetics" from Veterinary Genetics Laboratory, School of Veterinary Medicine, University of California, Davis.  Web Site accessed January 12, 2008

External links
 American Paint Horse Association
Tobiano test from Veterinary Genetics Laboratory, School of Veterinary Medicine, University of California, Davis.  Web Site accessed January 13, 2008
 "Horse coat color tests" from Veterinary Genetics Laboratory, School of Veterinary Medicine, University of California, Davis.  Web Site accessed January 12, 2008
"Introduction to Coat Color Genetics" from Veterinary Genetics Laboratory, School of Veterinary Medicine, University of California, Davis.  Web Site accessed January 12, 2008

Horse coat colors